Poya Asbaghi (born 17 July 1985) is a Swedish football manager who is the assistant manager of Red Star Belgrade.

Managerial career

IFK Göteborg
Asbaghi was appointed as manager of Swedish Allsvenskan side IFK Göteborg before the start of the 2018 Allsvenskan season. On 25 July 2019, IFK extended his contract until 2022. After the 2019 season, Poya Asbaghi was nominated as the manager of the year in Allsvenskan. He was subsequently offered the manager role at English Championship side Barnsley which he turned down.

Asbaghi led Göteborg to the 2019–20 Swedish Cup final after a win over IF Elfsborg on 9 July 2020. On 30 July 2020, Asbaghi and Göteborg won the 2020 Swedish Cup Final after a 2–1 extra time win over Malmö FF, qualifying the team to the 2020–21 UEFA Europa League qualifying rounds.

Asbaghi was relieved of his duties on 3 September 2020 during the 2020 season.

Sweden U21
On 24 November 2020, Asbaghi was appointed as manager of the Sweden U21 national team, with his contract running until summer 2023. He left in November 2021 to join Barnsley as their new head coach.

Barnsley
In November 2021, Asbaghi was appointed head coach of bottom side Championship club Barnsley after the sacking of former head coach Markus Schopp who had lost seven games in a row . Ferran Sibila became his assistant. Following relegation to League One for the 2022–23 season, Asbaghi left Barnsley by mutual agreement.

Red Star Belgrade
In September 2022, Asbaghi became assistant manager of Red Star Belgrade alongside manager  Miloš Milojević.

Personal life
Asbaghi has stated that his family fled from Iran when he was one year old because of political persecution and for being advocates of freedom and opponents of the regime; he dreams of one day being able to visit unhindered. Asbaghi grew up in Uppsala where his parents lived as of June 2020.

Managerial record

Managerial record by team and tenure

Honours
IFK Göteborg
Svenska Cupen: 2019–20

References

Living people
1985 births
People from Karaj
People from Uppsala
Iranian football managers
Swedish football managers
Iranian emigrants to Sweden
Sportspeople of Iranian descent
Dalkurd FF managers
Gefle IF managers
IFK Göteborg managers
Barnsley F.C. managers
Red Star Belgrade non-playing staff
Iranian expatriate football managers
Expatriate football managers in England
Swedish expatriate sportspeople in England
Swedish expatriate sportspeople in Serbia